Dehnasar Lake is a high-altitude freshwater lake lying in the Kangra District of Himachal Pradesh, India. This is a concurrent place for Kullu, Kangra and Mandi and people gathered 20th of Bhadrapada or Bhaado for the holy bath. (mainly during the last week of August or first week of September. Tobacoo, leather and other dirty stuff that harms the nature are not allowed here.

Geography
Although it is in Kangra District it is more approachable from Mandi and Kullu District creating a misconception as to its actual location. It is near Lugvally and Kullu.

The lake is situated beside rocky cliffs at the top of the mountain and derives its water from melted snow. It lies frozen under a thick coat of snow during winters. Blizzards and hailstorms are common due to high altitude.
 
Before starting your trekk government also provide a Forest rest house at Kadon on the bank of Sarwari river major tributary of Beas river  and Swar village which lies right bank of Lumbadug river, major tributary of Uhl river.

Trekking 
Shepherds are commonly sighted along the trek during pilgrimage, as well as rare herbs and flowers.
Right now the tourist activity is banned by the local authorities and peoples because of some environment pollution issue in 2021

References 

Lakes of Himachal Pradesh
Geography of Kullu district